Ahmet Nur Çebi (born 29 October 1959) is a Turkish businessman and current club president of Turkish multi-disciplined sports club Beşiktaş J.K.

Career
Ahmet Nur Çebi was born in 1959 in Trabzon, Turkey. He studied economics Marmara University, in Istanbul. He employed several titles at the group of companies of their family business.

Çebi joined presidency campaign of candidate Murat Aksu for election of 33rd Presidency of Beşiktaş J.K., which ended in favour of running president Yıldırım Demirören, in January 2010. In March 2012, Çebi was listed, this time in campaign board of directors members main list of candidate Fikret Orman against two other candidates in rally, who eventually won the election and held club's chair between 2012 and 2019. In April 2012, he was appointed as vice president under presidency of Fikret Orman.

Following resigning of Fikret Orman on 24 September 2019, Çebi ran his presidency campaign and he was elected as the 34th President of Beşiktaş J.K. during the extraordinary general assembly with election, collecting 5,009 of 8,644 of the voting cast, prevailing over two other candidates, Serdal Adalı and Hürser Tekinoktay, on 24 October 2019.

Personal life
Married in 1986, Çebi has got three children.

References

External links
Ahmet Nur Çebi at Beşiktaş J.K.

 
 

1959 births
People from Araklı
Marmara University alumni
Turkish businesspeople
Beşiktaş J.K. presidents
Living people